Saïdou Madi Panandétiguiri (born 22 March 1984) is a Burkinabé former professional footballer who played as a centre back or right back. He last played for FC Pune City in the Indian Super League.

Club career
Panandétiguiri was born in Ouahigouya. He began his career 1994 with Santos FC Ouagadougou and signed 2000 his first professional contract with ASFA Yennega. In 2001, he was scouted by Girondins Bordeaux, after five years in the reserve team from Girondins Bordeaux and 41 games he was sold to Lokeren. He played for Lokeren under Slavoljub Muslin. After Muslin transferred to Lokomotiv Moscow, Panandétiguiri wanted to follow him to but the transfer failed. Panandétiguiri signed on 6 May 2008 a three-year contract with SV Wehen Wiesbaden and played his first game on 24 September 2009. After just one year with SV Wehen Wiesbaden and the relegation, he signed in July 2009 with Le Havre AC, but the contract was after a short time terminated and he signed in August 2009 with U.D. Leiria.

In January 2012, Panandétiguiri signed for Maltese outfit Valletta FC, where he stayed a few months before signing with Antwerp.

International career
Panandétiguiri was a member of the Burkinabé 2004 African Nations Cup team, who finished bottom of their group in the first round of competition, thus failing to secure qualification for the quarter-finals. Panandétiguiri was member for Burkina Faso at 2003 FIFA World Youth Championship and 2001 FIFA U-17 World Championship. He also played in 2008 Pre-Olympics tournament, but along with Fousseni Traoré, were found too old for a U-23 event (born on or after 1 January 1985). So the FIFA awarded Ghana who originally lost 0–2 to win 3–0.

Career statistics

International goals
Scores and results list. Burkina Faso's goal tally first.

References

External links
 
 Saïdou Panandétiguiri at kicker.de 

1984 births
Living people
People from Nord Region (Burkina Faso)
Association football fullbacks
Burkinabé footballers
ASFA Yennenga players
Burkinabé expatriate footballers
Burkinabé expatriate sportspeople in France
Expatriate footballers in France
FC Girondins de Bordeaux players
Expatriate footballers in Belgium
Belgian Pro League players
K.S.C. Lokeren Oost-Vlaanderen players
Expatriate footballers in Germany
SV Wehen Wiesbaden players
Expatriate footballers in Portugal
Primeira Liga players
U.D. Leiria players
2. Bundesliga players
Expatriate footballers in Malta
Expatriate soccer players in South Africa
Valletta F.C. players
Royal Antwerp F.C. players
Challenger Pro League players
Burkina Faso youth international footballers
Burkina Faso international footballers
2002 African Cup of Nations players
2004 African Cup of Nations players
2010 Africa Cup of Nations players
2012 Africa Cup of Nations players
2013 Africa Cup of Nations players
Chippa United F.C. players
21st-century Burkinabé people